Maratus aquilus is a species of the peacock spider genus, discovered in 2019 by Australian scientist Joseph Schubert.

The discovery of the three spiders (Maratus aquilus, Maratus combustus and Maratus felinus) were made in Lake Jasper and Mount Romance in Western Australia, Australia.

References

Salticidae
Spiders of Australia
Spiders described in 2019